Archduke Franz Ferdinand Carl Ludwig Joseph Maria of Austria (18 December 1863 – 28 June 1914) was the heir presumptive to the throne of Austria-Hungary. His assassination in Sarajevo was the most immediate cause of World War I.

Franz Ferdinand was the eldest son of Archduke Karl Ludwig of Austria, the younger brother of Emperor Franz Joseph I of Austria. Following the death of Crown Prince Rudolf in 1889 and the death of Karl Ludwig in 1896, Franz Ferdinand became the heir presumptive to the Austro-Hungarian throne. His courtship of Sophie Chotek, a lady-in-waiting, caused conflict within the imperial household, and their morganatic marriage in 1900 was only allowed after he renounced his descendants' rights to the throne. Franz Ferdinand held significant influence over the military, and in 1913 he was appointed inspector general of the Austro-Hungarian armed forces.

On 28 June 1914, Franz Ferdinand and his wife were assassinated in Sarajevo by the 19-year-old Gavrilo Princip, a member of Young Bosnia. Franz Ferdinand's assassination led to the July Crisis and precipitated Austria-Hungary's declaration of war against Serbia, which in turn triggered a series of events that eventually ledfour weeks after his deathto Austria-Hungary's allies and Serbia's allies declaring war on each other, starting World War I.

Early life
Franz Ferdinand was born in Graz, Austria, the eldest son of Archduke Karl Ludwig of Austria (the younger brother of Franz Joseph and Maximilian) and of his second wife, Princess Maria Annunciata of Bourbon-Two Sicilies. In 1875, when he was eleven years old, his cousin Francis V, Duke of Modena, died, naming Franz Ferdinand his heir on condition that he add the name "Este" to his own. Franz Ferdinand thus became one of the wealthiest men in Austria.

Heir presumptive
In 1889, Franz Ferdinand's life changed dramatically.  His cousin Crown Prince Rudolf committed suicide at his hunting lodge in Mayerling. This left Franz Ferdinand's father, Karl Ludwig, as first in line to the throne. Karl Ludwig died of typhoid fever in 1896. Henceforth, Franz Ferdinand was groomed to succeed to the throne.

Despite this burden, he did manage to find time for travel and personal pursuits, such as his circumnavigation of the world between 1892 and 1893. After visiting India he spent time  hunting kangaroos and emus in Australia in 1893, then travelled on to Nouméa, New Hebrides, Solomon Islands, New Guinea, Sarawak, Hong Kong and Japan. After sailing across the Pacific on the RMS Empress of China from Yokohama to Vancouver he crossed the United States, arriving at the World's Columbian Exposition 1893 on the Chicago, Burlington, and Quincy Railroad on a private Pullman car named Mascotte, and staying at the Lexington Hotel, before continuing through to New York and returning to Europe.

Franz Ferdinand had a fondness for trophy hunting that was excessive even by the standards of European nobility of this time. In his diaries he kept track of 272,511 game kills, 5,000 of which were deer. About 100,000 trophies were on exhibit at his Bohemian castle at Konopiště which he also stuffed with various antiquities, his other great passion.

Military career
Franz Ferdinand, like most males in the ruling Habsburg line, entered the Austro-Hungarian Army at a young age.  He was frequently and rapidly promoted, given the rank of lieutenant at age fourteen, captain at twenty-two, colonel at twenty-seven, and major general at thirty-one. While never receiving formal staff training, he was considered eligible for command and at one point briefly led the primarily Hungarian 9th Hussar Regiment. In 1898 he was given a commission "at the special disposition of His Majesty" to make inquiries into all aspects of the military services and military agencies were commanded to share their papers with him.

He also held honorary ranks in the Austro-Hungarian Navy, and received the rank of Admiral at the close of the Austro-Hungarian naval maneuvers in September 1902.

Franz Ferdinand exerted influence on the armed forces even when he did not hold a specific command through a military chancery that produced and received documents and papers on military affairs. His authority was reinforced in 1907 when he secured the retirement of the Emperor's confidant Friedrich von Beck-Rzikowsky as Chief of the General Staff. Beck's successor, Franz Conrad von Hötzendorf, was personally selected by Franz Ferdinand.

Franz in 1913, as heir-presumptive to the elderly emperor, had been appointed inspector general of all the armed forces of Austria-Hungary (Generalinspektor der gesamten bewaffneten Macht), a position superior to that previously held by Archduke Albrecht and including presumed command in wartime.

Marriage and family

In 1894, Franz Ferdinand met Countess Sophie Chotek, a lady-in-waiting to Archduchess Isabella, wife of Archduke Friedrich, Duke of Teschen. Franz began to visit Archduke Friedrich's villa in Pressburg (now Bratislava), and in turn Sophie wrote to Franz Ferdinand during his convalescence from tuberculosis on the island of Lošinj in the Adriatic. They kept their relationship a secret, until it was discovered by Isabella herself.

To be eligible to marry a member of the imperial House of Habsburg, one had to be a member of one of the reigning or formerly reigning dynasties of Europe. The Choteks were not one of these families. Deeply in love, Franz Ferdinand refused to consider marrying anyone else. Finally, in 1899, Emperor Franz Joseph agreed to permit Franz Ferdinand to marry Sophie, on the condition that the marriage would be morganatic and that their descendants would not have succession rights to the throne.  Sophie would not share her husband's rank, title, precedence, or privileges; as such, she would not normally appear in public beside him. She would not be allowed to ride in the royal carriage or sit in the royal box in theaters.

The wedding took place on 1 July 1900, at Reichstadt (now Zákupy) in Bohemia; Franz Joseph did not attend the affair, nor did any archduke including Franz Ferdinand's brothers. The only members of the imperial family who were present were Franz Ferdinand's stepmother, Princess Maria Theresa of Braganza; and her two daughters. Upon the marriage, Sophie was given the title "Princess of Hohenberg" with the style "Her Serene Highness".  In 1909, she was given the more senior title "Duchess of Hohenberg" with the style "Her Highness". This raised her status considerably, but she was still required to yield precedence at court to all the archduchesses. Whenever a function required the couple to assemble with the other members of the imperial family, Sophie was forced to stand far down the line, separated from her husband.

Franz Ferdinand's children were:
 Princess Sophie of Hohenberg (1901–1990), married Count Friedrich von Nostitz-Rieneck (1891–1973)
 Maximilian, Duke of Hohenberg (1902–1962), married Countess Elisabeth von Waldburg zu Wolfegg und Waldsee (1904–1993)
 Prince Ernst of Hohenberg (1904–1954), married Marie-Therese Wood (1910–1985)
 Stillborn son (1908), buried in Artstetten Castle, near his parents

Franz Ferdinand and Sophie visited England in the autumn of 1913, spending a week with George V and Queen Mary at Windsor Castle before going to stay for another week with the Duke of Portland at Welbeck Abbey, Nottinghamshire, where they arrived on 22 November. He attended a service at the local Catholic church in Worksop.  Franz Ferdinand and the Duke of Portland went game shooting on the Welbeck estate when, according to Portland's memoirs, Men, Women and Things:

Character
The German historian Michael Freund described Franz Ferdinand as "a man of uninspired energy, dark in appearance and emotion, who radiated an aura of strangeness and cast a shadow of violence and recklessness ... a true personality amidst the amiable inanity that characterized Austrian society at this time." As his sometime admirer Karl Kraus put it, "he was not one who would greet you ... he felt no compulsion to reach out for the unexplored region which the Viennese call their heart." His relations with Emperor Franz Joseph were tense; the emperor's personal servant recalled in his memoirs that "thunder and lightning always raged when they had their discussions." The commentaries and orders which the heir to the throne wrote as margin notes to the documents of the Imperial central commission for architectural conservation (where he was Protector) reveal what can be described as "choleric conservatism." The Italian historian Leo Valiani provided the following description.

Political views

"The three cornerstones of Ferdinand’s political conviction were clericalism, anti-democratic views, and anti-Hungarianism,” and the basis of his worldview was that “politics is a matter only for the ruler, while the people, the masses have to obey.” Franz Ferdinand often complained that in Hungary, the glorification of revolutionary hero Lajos Kossuth, the decline of the monarchical principle, and the dominance of the Freemasons and the Jewish people was prevalent. Historians have disagreed on how to characterize the political philosophies of Franz Ferdinand, some attributing generally liberal views on the empire's nationalities while others have emphasized his dynastic centralism, Catholic conservatism, and tendency to clash with other leaders. He advocated granting greater autonomy to ethnic groups within the Empire and addressing their grievances, especially the Czechs in Bohemia and the south Slavic peoples in Croatia and Bosnia, who had been left out of the Austro-Hungarian Compromise of 1867. Yet his feelings towards the Hungarians were less generous, often described as antipathy. For example, in 1904 he wrote that "The Hungarians are all rabble, regardless of whether they are minister or duke, cardinal or burgher, peasant, hussar, domestic servant, or revolutionary", and he regarded even István Tisza as a revolutionary and "patented traitor". He regarded Hungarian nationalism as a revolutionary threat to the Habsburg dynasty and reportedly became angry when officers of the 9th Hussars Regiment (which he commanded) spoke Hungarian in his presence – despite the fact that it was the official regimental language. He further regarded the Hungarian branch of the Dual Monarchy's army, the Honvédség, as an unreliable and potentially threatening force within the empire, complaining at the Hungarians' failure to provide funds for the joint army and opposing the formation of artillery units within the Hungarian forces.

He also advocated a cautious approach towards Serbia – repeatedly locking horns with Franz Conrad von Hötzendorf, Vienna's hard-line Chief of the Austro-Hungarian General Staff, warning that harsh treatment of Serbia would bring Austria-Hungary into open conflict with Russia, to the ruin of both empires.

He was disappointed when Austria-Hungary failed to act as a great power, such as during the Boxer Rebellion in 1900. Other nations, including, in his description, "dwarf states like Belgium and Portugal", had soldiers stationed in China, but Austria-Hungary did not. However, Austria-Hungary did participate in the Eight-Nation Alliance to suppress the Boxers, and sent soldiers as part of the "international relief force".

Franz Ferdinand was a prominent and influential supporter of the Austro-Hungarian Navy in a time when sea power was not a priority in Austrian foreign policy and the Navy was relatively little known or supported by the public. After his assassination in 1914, the Navy honoured Franz Ferdinand and his wife with a lying in state aboard SMS Viribus Unitis.

Assassination

On Sunday, 28 June 1914, at about 10:45 am, Franz Ferdinand and his wife were assassinated in Sarajevo, the capital of the Austro-Hungarian province of Bosnia and Herzegovina. The perpetrator was 19-year-old Gavrilo Princip, a member of Young Bosnia and one of a group of assassins organized and armed by the Black Hand.

Earlier in the day, the couple had been attacked by Nedeljko Čabrinović, also a Young Bosnia conspirator, who had thrown a grenade at their car. However, the bomb detonated behind them, injuring the occupants in the following car. On arriving at the Governor's residence, Franz asked "So you welcome your guests with bombs!"

After a short rest at the Governor's residence, the royal couple insisted on seeing all those who had been injured by the bomb at the local hospital. However, no one told the drivers that the itinerary had been changed. When the error was discovered, the drivers had to turn around. As the cars backed down the street and onto a side street, the line of cars stalled. At this time, Princip was sitting at a cafe across the street. He instantly seized his opportunity and walked across the street and shot the royal couple. He first shot Sophie in the abdomen and then shot Franz Ferdinand in the neck. Franz leaned over his crying wife. He was still alive when witnesses arrived to render aid. His dying words to Sophie were, "Don't die darling, live for our children." Princip's weapon was the pocket-sized FN Model 1910 pistol chambered for the .380 ACP cartridge provided him by Serbian Army Military Intelligence Lieutenant-Colonel and Black Hand leader Dragutin Dimitrijević. Franz Ferdinand's aides attempted to undo his coat but realized they needed scissors to cut it open: the outer lapel had been sewn to the inner front of the jacket for a smoother fit to improve his appearance to the public.  Whether or not as a result of this obstacle, his wound could not be attended to in time to save him, and he died within minutes. Sophie also died en route to the hospital.

A detailed account of the shooting can be found in Sarajevo by Joachim Remak:
One bullet pierced Franz Ferdinand's neck while the other pierced Sophie's abdomen. ... As the car was reversing (to go back to the Governor's residence because the entourage thought the Imperial couple were unhurt) a thin streak of blood shot from the Archduke's mouth onto Count Harrach's right cheek (he was standing on the car's running board). Harrach drew out a handkerchief to still the gushing blood. The Duchess, seeing this, called: "For Heaven's sake! What happened to you?" and sank from her seat, her face falling between her husband's knees.

Harrach and Potoriek ... thought she had fainted ... only her husband seemed to have an instinct for what was happening. Turning to his wife despite the bullet in his neck, Franz Ferdinand pleaded: "Sopherl! Sopherl! Sterbe nicht! Bleibe am Leben für unsere Kinder! – Sophie dear! Don't die! Stay alive for our children!" Having said this, he seemed to sag down himself. His plumed hat ... fell off; many of its green feathers were found all over the car floor. Count Harrach seized the Archduke by the uniform collar to hold him up. He asked "Leiden Eure Kaiserliche Hoheit sehr? – Is Your Imperial Highness suffering very badly?"  "Es ist nichts. – It is nothing." said the Archduke in a weak but audible voice. He seemed to be losing consciousness during his last few minutes, but, his voice growing steadily weaker, he repeated the phrase perhaps six or seven times more.

A rattle began to issue from his throat, which subsided as the car drew in front of the Konak bersibin (Town Hall).
Despite several doctors' efforts, the Archduke died shortly after being carried into the building while his beloved wife was almost certainly dead from internal bleeding before the motorcade reached the Konak.

The assassinations, along with the arms race, nationalism, imperialism, militarism of Imperial Germany and the alliance system all contributed to the origins of World War I, which began a month after Franz Ferdinand's death, with Austria-Hungary's declaration of war against Serbia. The assassination of Franz Ferdinand is considered the most immediate cause of World War I.

After his death, Archduke Karl became the heir presumptive of Austria-Hungary. Franz Ferdinand was buried with his wife Sophie in Artstetten Castle, Austria.

Commemorations

Archduke Franz Ferdinand and his Castle of Artstetten were selected as a main motif for the Austrian 10 euro The Castle of Artstetten commemorative coin, minted on 13 October 2004. The reverse shows the entrance to the crypt of the Hohenberg family. There are two portraits below, showing Archduke Franz Ferdinand and his wife Sophie, Duchess of Hohenberg.

Titles, styles, honours and arms

Titles and styles
 18 December 1863 – 20 November 1875: His Imperial and Royal Highness Archduke and Prince Franz Ferdinand of Austria, Prince of Hungary, Bohemia and Croatia
 20 November 1875 – 28 June 1914: His Imperial and Royal Highness Franz Ferdinand, Archduke of Austria-Este

Honours and awards
Domestic
 Knight of the Golden Fleece, 1878
 Grand Cross of the Royal Hungarian Order of St. Stephen, 1893
 Military Merit Cross, in Diamonds
 Silver Military Merit Medal on Red Ribbon
 Long Service Cross for Officers, 2nd Class
 Bronze Jubilee Medal for the Armed Forces

Foreign

See also
 July Crisis
 List of heirs to the Austrian throne

Footnotes

References

Further reading
 
  Fomenko, A. "There Was an Alternative! The Legacy of Franz Ferdinand" International Affairs: A Russian Journal of World Politics, Diplomacy & International Relations (2009) 55#3 p177-184.

External links

 Newsreels about Franz Ferdinand's assassination at www.europeanfilmgateway.eu

 

1863 births
1914 deaths
1914 murders in Europe
Assassinated Austrian people
Assassinated royalty
 
Austria-Este
Austrian adoptees
Austrian people murdered abroad
Austrian princes
Austrian Roman Catholics
Austro-Hungarian admirals
Austro-Hungarian generals
Deaths by firearm in Bosnia and Herzegovina
Extra Knights Companion of the Garter
2
2
Grand Crosses of the Order of Saint Stephen of Hungary
Grand Crosses of the Order of the Star of Romania
Honorary Knights Grand Cross of the Order of the Bath
House of Habsburg-Lorraine
Hungarian Roman Catholics
Knights of the Golden Fleece of Austria
Knights of the Holy Sepulchre
Knights of the Order of Saint Joseph
Male murder victims
People from Graz
People killed in intelligence operations
People murdered in Bosnia and Herzegovina
Recipients of the Order of St. Anna, 1st class
Recipients of the Order of Saint Stanislaus (Russian), 1st class
Recipients of the Order of the White Eagle (Russia)
Non-inheriting heirs presumptive